Ormrinn Langi in Old Norse (The Long Serpent)  Ormen Lange in Norwegian, Ormurin Langi in Faroese was one of the most famous of the Viking longships. It was built for the Norwegian King Olav Tryggvason, and was the largest and most powerful longship of its day. In the late 990s King Olav was on a "Crusade" around the country to bring Christianity to Norway. When he was traveling north to Hålogaland he came to a petty kingdom in today's Skjerstad, where the king named Raud the Strong refused to convert to Christianity.  A battle ensued, during which Saltstraum, a maelstrom that prevented reinforcements to the king's men, forced King Olav to flee. He continued up north but returned some weeks later when the maelstrom had subsided. Olav won the battle, captured Raud, and gave him two choices: die or convert. The Sagas say that Olav tried to convert him but Raud cursed the name of Jesus, and the King became so enraged that he stuck a kvanstilk (a stalk of Angelica, which are hollow) down his throat and shoved a snake into it, then a burning iron to force the snake down his throat. The snake ate its way out of the side of the torso of Raud and killed him. After the victory Olav confiscated Raud's riches, not least of which was Raud's ship, which he rechristened Ormen (The Serpent). He took it to Trondheim and used it as a design for his own new ship, which he made a couple of "rooms" longer than Ormen and named Ormen Lange.

The ship reportedly had 34 rooms, i.e., was built with 34 pairs of oars, for a crew of 68 rowers (and additional crew members). The ship's sides were unusually high, "as high as that of a Knarr". 

Ormen Lange was the last ship to be taken in the Battle of Svolder, where Olav was killed (although his body was never found—some stories tell of the king jumping into the water either sinking due to the weight of his armour or escaping in the confusion) by a coalition of his enemies in the year 1000.

Its story is told in a traditional Faroese ballad, or Kvæði, called "Ormurin Langi".

References

Björn Landström, The Ship: Illustrated History (1961)

10th century in Norway
History of transport in Norway
Ships built in Trondheim
Viking ships
Ships of Norway
Medieval ships